Mellow Candle were a progressive folk rock band. Principally Irish, the members were also young, Clodagh Simonds being only 15 and Alison Bools (later O'Donnell) and Maria White 16, and still at school, at the time of their first single, "Feelin' High", released in 1968 on Simon Napier-Bell's SNB Records.

By 1972, the lineup had expanded to include Dave Williams on guitar, Frank Boylan on bass, and William Murray on drums. With this lineup in place, the band released their only album, Swaddling Songs (Deram Records), which was commercially unsuccessful at the time. Over the years, however, the lone album by the band has received considerable critical acclaim and original vinyl copies are now very valuable. Boylan was later replaced by Steve Borrill (ex-Spirogyra), but shortly afterwards the band split up.

After Mellow Candle 
After the band's dissolution, Simonds worked with Thin Lizzy, Jade Warrior, and Mike Oldfield. Boylan played with Gary Moore, while Murray contributed to albums by Kevin Ayers, Amazing Blondel, Mike Oldfield, and Paul Kossoff.

In 1991, "Silver Song" was covered by All About Eve as a B-side to some versions of their single, "Farewell Mr. Sorrow".

1996 saw the release of The Virgin Prophet, a collection of previously unreleased material by the band, including early versions of many of the songs later released on Swaddling Songs. Some of these sessions featured Richard Coughlan of Caravan on drums, although his sessions do not feature on The Virgin Prophet.

In 1996, Simonds recorded Six Elementary Songs, released in 1997 on the Tokyo-based Evangel Records.

In 1999, Simonds recorded a version of Syd Barrett's setting of the James Joyce poem "Golden Hair" for Russell Mills' album, Pearl and Umbra. 2006-7 saw the participation of Simonds in a musical project called Fovea Hex, alongside Brian Eno, Roger Eno, film composer Carter Burwell, Andrew McKenzie of the Hafler Trio, 
Steven Wilson, Colin Potter (of Nurse With Wound), Robert Fripp, Percy Jones, and others. The project was favourably reviewed by Pitchfork Media. Also in 2006, Simonds performed a version of "Idumaea" for Current 93's album Black Ships Ate The Sky, and a version of "Cockles and Mussels" for Matmos's EP "For Alan Turing".

In 2006, O'Donnell was reunited with Dave Williams and Frank Boylan on the album Mise Agus Ise. She followed this with the 2008 EP The Fabric of Folk on Static Caravan (a collaboration with English folk/rock band The Owl Service), and her debut solo album, Hey Hey Hippy Witch, released at the end of 2009 on Floating World.

Discography
 Albums
 Swaddling Songs (1972)
 The Virgin Prophet (rec. 1969-1971, rel. 1996)

 Singles
 "Feeling High" / "Tea With The Sun" (1968)
 "Dan The Wing" / "Silversong" (1972)

References

External links
Mellow Candle - comprehensive history extracted from Irish Folk, Trad and Blues - A Secret History
janetrecords.com, (Clodagh Simonds' website)
Alison O'Donnell's website
 Swaddling Songs at 50 | The Lyric Feature 50 year anniversary documentary celebrating Mellow Candle, on RTÉ lyric fm (June 2022).

Psychedelic folk groups
Irish folk musical groups
Irish rock music groups
Musical groups from Dublin (city)
Deram Records artists
People from Killiney